Otaghware Otas Onodjayeke, known by his stage name Igosave (born 20 May 1979) is a Nigerian comedian from Delta State, Nigeria. who had organized different shows, such as Igosave Unusual'.

 Early life and education 
Otaghware Otas Onodjayeke was born in Warri, Delta State, Nigeria in 1979. He went to Aileru Primary School and Essi Secondary School. After secondary school, he attended the Polytechnic Auchi, where he studied painting and general art. He finished an NYSC degree at the University of Lagos.

 Comedy career 
Igosave first performed comedy at the Nite of a 1000 Laughs show, organized by Opa Williams. During the show, he worked alongside other comedians, such as I Go Dye, bovi, Buchi (comedian), Basketmouth, Ali Baba, Teju Babyface, and others. His annual Igosave Unusual'' show has held all throughout Nigeria.

Awards

References

External links 
 https://www.twitter.com/IGOSAVE

1979 births
Living people
Nigerian male comedians
University of Lagos people
Auchi Polytechnic alumni